Victoire-Melone Geayant, stage name Mademoiselle Guéant (fl. 1749–1758), was a French stage actress. 

She was engaged at the Comédie-Française in 1749. She became a Sociétaires of the Comédie-Française in 1754. She retired in 1758. 

She played romantic heroines and enjoyed a short but successful career before her premature death from smallpox.

References

External links 
   Mademoiselle Guéant, Comédie-Française

18th-century births
1758 deaths
18th-century French actresses
French stage actresses